A selective estrogen receptor degrader or downregulator (SERD) is a type of drug which binds to the estrogen receptor (ER) and, in the process of doing so, causes the ER to be degraded and thus downregulated.  They are used to treat estrogen receptor-sensitive or progesterone receptor-sensitive breast cancer, along with older classes of drugs like selective estrogen receptor modulators (SERMs) and aromatase inhibitors.

As of 2016 the only marketed SERD was fulvestrant (brand name Faslodex). As of November 2016 other SERDs under development include brilanestrant and elacestrant.  The clinical success of fulvestrant led to efforts to discover and develop a parallel drug class of selective androgen receptor degraders (SARDs).

Investigational

Fulvestrant requires large-volume and frequently painful intramuscular injections.  In response, pharmaceutical companies are currently developing oral SERDs. Among products in development are:

 Giredestrant: Roche
 Amcenestrant (SAR439859): Sanofi
 AZD9833: AstraZeneca
 Rintodestrant: G1 Therapeutics
 LSZ102: Novartis
 LY3484356: Eli Lilly
 Elacestrant: Radius Health
 ZN-c5: Zentalis
 D-0502: Inventisbio
 SHR9549: Jiangsu Hengrui Medicine

The oral SERDs target ER-positive/HER2-negative breast cancer and are tested as monotherapy and in combination with other drugs such as the CDK inhibitor palbociclib (Ibrance).

See also
 Aromatase inhibitor
 Estrogen deprivation therapy

References

 
Antiestrogens
Hormonal antineoplastic drugs